Laguna José Ignacio (José Ignacio Lagoon) is a body of water located in Maldonado Department, Uruguay.

A sandbank separates it from the Atlantic Ocean. It is an important birdwatching location.

The nearest famous seaside resort is José Ignacio.

References

External links
 Laguna José Ignacio

Jose Ignacio
Landforms of Maldonado Department
Birdwatching sites in Uruguay
Lagoons of South America